Shishihō Yoshimasa (born Osamu Tanaka; August 14, 1955 – October 7, 2006) was a sumo wrestler from Moriyama, Nagasaki, Japan. He made his professional debut in January 1971, and became the first sekitori from Taiho stable when he reached the juryo division in July 1977. He reached the top division in September 1979. His highest rank was maegashira 2. His favourite techniques were migi-yotsu and uwatenage. Upon retirement in May 1987 he was hired by the Sumo Association as a wakaimonogashira.  He left the sumo world in July 1991. He died of cancer in 2006.

Career record

See also
Glossary of sumo terms
List of past sumo wrestlers
List of sumo tournament second division champions

References

1955 births
Japanese sumo wrestlers
Sumo people from Nagasaki Prefecture
2006 deaths